Krystyna Hryshutyna (born 21 March 1992) is a long jumper from Ukraine. She competed at the 2015 World Championships in Beijing without qualifying for the final.
 
Her personal bests in the event are 6.81 metres outdoors (+1.1 m/s, Kirovohrad 2015) and 6.41 metres indoors (Kiev 2015).

Competition record

References

Ukrainian female long jumpers
Living people
Place of birth missing (living people)
1992 births
World Athletics Championships athletes for Ukraine
Athletes (track and field) at the 2016 Summer Olympics
Olympic athletes of Ukraine
21st-century Ukrainian women